Östra Sorgenfri is a neighbourhood of Malmö, situated in the Borough of Södra Innerstaden, Malmö Municipality, Skåne County, Sweden.

References

Neighbourhoods of Malmö